Faristenia medimaculata is a moth in the family Gelechiidae. It is found in China (Jiangxi).

References

Faristenia
Moths described in 1998